Bonfiglio is a surname. Notable people with the surname include:

Charles J. Bonfiglio (born 1962), American businessman
Óscar Bonfiglio (1905-1987), Mexican football player
Pascual Bonfiglio (1907-?), Argentine boxer
Robert Bonfiglio (born 1950), American harmonica player
Stefano Bonfiglio (born 1964), Italian businessman
Jeremy D. Bonfiglio (born 1970), American journalist
Susanna Bonfiglio (born 1974), Italian basketball player